Schloredt Nunatak is a nunatak 1 nautical mile (1.9 km) south of Bleclic Peaks, at the south extremity of the Perry Range in Marie Byrd Land, Antarctica. Mapped by United States Geological Survey (USGS) from surveys and U.S. Navy air photos, 1959–65. Named by Advisory Committee on Antarctic Names (US-ACAN) for Jerry L. Schloredt, Senior Chief Construction Electrician, U.S. Navy, who served as Nuclear Power Plant Operator with the [[Naval Nuclear Power Unit], PM-3A] at McMurdo Station. Wintered over Deep Freeze 1964, 1968 and 1973, and Summer Support DF65,66,67, a total of 49 months at McMurdo Station. Was Officer in Charge, Acting, Crew XII, DF73.

Nunataks of Marie Byrd Land